In Jerusalem (Bi-rushalayim, Jerusalem) (1963) is a documentary film by David Perlov.  This film came to be one of the most important films of Israeli documentary cinema.

Considered by many as one of the most poetic films ever produced in Israeli Film, and as a milestone in Israeli documentary cinema, In Jerusalem is composed of 10 engaged observations of the city, before it was united. Uri Klein (Haaretz) wrote: "When I first saw In Jerusalem, in 1963, I was not fully aware yet of the importance of the film itself or of its director, but I knew that I had never seen an Israeli film such as that. I felt that the Israeli cinema was being born right in front of my eyes".

Awards 
 Venice Festival 1963, bronze medal
 'Director of the Year', Van Leer Institute

Footsteps in Jerusalem
In 2013, 50 years after In Jerusalem, and inspired by Perlov, leading filmmakers from the Sam Spiegel Film and Television School tell their story using their own personal perspective. Nine select films were curated with the original In Jerusalem to form a new, inter-generational film about a city that has dramatically changed – politically, demographically, economically and culturally. Directed by: David Perlov, Dan Geva, David Ofek, Nadav Lapid, Benjamin Freidenberg, Moran Ifergan, Yarden Karmin, Amichai Chasson and Elad Schwartz, Boaz Frankel and Yair Agmon, Nayef Hammoud and Yotam Kislev.

References

External links

Films set in 1963
Films shot in Israel
Israeli short documentary films
1960s short documentary films
1960s Hebrew-language films